Tahtacı are Alevi Muslim Turkomans living mainly in the forested areas of Aegean and Mediterranean regions of Turkey. Tahtacıs engage woodworking since the Ottoman periods. They are thought to be descendants of the historical Ağaçeri tribe (from ), the supposed descendants of the Akatziri tribe that lived north of the Black Sea in the 5th century AD, however, Peter Benjamin Golden argued that this thesis was not "firmly grounded in anything beyond phonetic resemblance".

History 

Tahtacı originate from the Üçok (three arrows) Turkomans. The Tahtacı in Taurus mountains felled timber, which was then sent from Antalya, Alanya, Finike and other ports. The export of timber was a government monopoly, custom receipts from timber and pitch reaching about 3,500 gold ducats in 1477.

When Timur took Turkestan and Greater Khorasan under his rule, some of the Agaceris, who had to leave their homeland, settled in Iran and the majority in Anatolia. According to some other sources, a great migration wave took place in 466, and the Agaceri tribes belonging to the Huns came and settled in Anatolia. After the  invasion of Anatolia by the Mongols, Agaceris who came here migrated to  Syria and Iraq this time to hide from the Mongols. It is accepted that some of them returned to Anatolia in 1405 after Timur's death and were known as 'Tahtacı' from this period. It is known that Mehmed the Conqueror brought Tahtacı people from the villages in the Kaz Mountains of Balıkesir for the construction of the ships used during the conquest of Istanbul in 1453.
In the written sources, the name Tahtacı is first encountered in the Ottoman tax population cadastral registers in the 16th century as “Cemāat-ı Tahtacıyān”.

After the Battle of Chaldiran in 1514, Ottoman Empire under the rule of Selim I started targeting Alevis. This has caused Tahtacı people to move their already secluded lives even to a further extent in forestry areas of Southern and Western Anatolia. As the minority Shiites under Sunni rule of the Ottoman Empire, they frequently requested help and protection from the Safavids, the only Shiite state of the time, and the Ottomans' neighbor and enemy.

Settlement areas in Turkey 
Tahtacıs mainly live in Mersin, Adana, Antalya, Denizli, Isparta, Burdur, Muğla, Aydın, İzmir, Manisa, Balıkesir and Çanakkale.

Villages in Mersin Province:

 Toroslar: Dalakderesi, Düğdüören, Bekiralanı, Kuzucubelen
 Erdemli: Tömük
 Silifke: Sayağzı, Kırtıl
  Mut: Yazalanı, Kayabaşı, Keleceköy, Kamaçukuru Köprübaşı
 Tarsus: Çamalan, Kaburgediği
 Anamur: Kaşdişlen
 Bozyazı: Çubukkoyağı, Bahçekoyağı, Tekedüzü

Villages in Antalya Province:
 Elmalı: Akçainiş
 Finike: Alacadağ, Arifköy, Gökbük
 Kumluca: Beşikçi, Hızırkahya, Toptaş
 Manavgat: Dolbazlar, Sağırin

Villages in Balıkesir Province:
 Balıkesir: Türkali
 Burhaniye: Pelitköy, Tahtacı, Taşçılar
 Edremit: Arıtaşı, Çamcı, Doyran, Hacıhasanlar, Kavlaklar, Kızılçukur, Mehmetalan, Poyratlı, Tahtakuşlar, Yassıçalı
 Kepsut: Mehmetler
 Savaştepe: Kongurca

Villages in Çanakkale Province:
 Çanakkale Province: Akçeşme, Aykınoba, Çiftlikdere, Damyeri, Daşbaşı, Değirmendere, Denizgöründü, Elmacık, Gürecik, Kayadere, Kemerdere, Yenimahalle
 Ayvacık: Bahçedere, Çakalini, Çiftlik, Durdağı, Güzelköy, Kokulutaş, Kıztaşı, Uzunalan
 Bayramiç: Güven, Karıncalı
 Ezine: Derbentbaşı, Eğridere, Koşuburun

Villages in Gaziantep Province:
 İslahiye District: Kabaklar, Çerçili

Religion 

Tahtacıs are Qizilbash Alevis. Although there is evidence of Shamanism in their beliefs and lifestyles, this culture they preserve has blended with and heavily influenced Alevi beliefs and customs over the course of History. Tahtacı Turkomans put their favourite items and clothes in their graves, which is an example of their shamanistic customs. Ahmad Yasawi and Pir Sultan Abdal among others are some of the most respected religious figures among Tahtacı. Bektashism was particularly strong among the Turkomans of Taurus mountains (principally the Tahtaci and Varsak tribes).

Culture
Tahtacı have always lived together with nature throughout history. They have a great cultural richness with their clothing, handicrafts and food cultures. In terms of customs and traditions, they carry traces of Central Asian Turkish culture. Tahtacı men and women work together in woodworking, which they pursue as a craft. Some people, due to the decreasing public pressure after the declaration of the  Republic, divided into various occupational groups.

Notable Tahtacı
Musa Eroğlu, folk musician and bağlama virtuoso.

Notes

References 

Alevism
Ethnic groups in Turkey
Turkoman tribes
Turkish people